Keith Moffatt (born 1935) is a Scottish mathematician. Keith Moffatt and similar names may also refer to:

Keith Moffatt (athlete) (born 1984), American high jumper
John Keith Moffat (born 1943), University of Chicago biophysicist
Keith Moffitt, British Liberal Democrat local government politician

See also
Moffat (surname)